Anthony Moore is an American attorney and politician serving as a member of the Oklahoma House of Representatives from the 57th district. He assumed office on November 18, 2020.

Early life and education 
Born and raised in Clinton, Oklahoma, Moore attended Clinton High School. He earned a Bachelor of Arts degree in political science and government from Oklahoma Christian University and a Juris Doctor from the Oklahoma City University School of Law. He also studied international law at the University of Granada.

Career 
Moore served as an assistant district attorney for Custer County, Latimer County, and Washita County. He has also worked as an attorney at various law firms. Moore was elected to the Oklahoma House of Representatives in November 2020. He also serves as vice chair of the House Energy & Natural Resources Committee.

References 

Living people
People from Clinton, Oklahoma
Oklahoma Christian University alumni
Oklahoma City University School of Law alumni
Oklahoma lawyers
Republican Party members of the Oklahoma House of Representatives
Year of birth missing (living people)